WKZE has been the callsign of two radio stations in northwest Connecticut which also serve New York's Hudson Valley, and Berkshire County, Massachusetts.

WHDD (AM), the former WKZE (AM), 1020 kHz Sharon (which airs local block programming)
WKZE-FM 98.1 MHz Salisbury (which airs a noted Adult Album Alternative format)

WKZE is also the original 1980-83 call for WKPE-FM "Cape 104" in South Yarmouth, Massachusetts